Selaginella is the sole genus in the family Selaginellaceae, the spikemosses or lesser clubmosses, a kind of vascular plant.

This family is distinguished from Lycopodiaceae (the clubmosses) by having scale-leaves bearing a ligule and by having spores of two types.  They are sometimes included in an informal paraphyletic group called the "fern allies". S. moellendorffii is an important model organism. Its genome has been sequenced by the United States Department of Energy's Joint Genome Institute. The name Selaginella was erected by Palisot de Beauvois solely for the species Selaginella selaginoides, which turns out (with the closely related Selaginella deflexa) to be a clade that is sister to all other Selaginellas, so any definitive subdivision of the species into separate genera leaves two taxa in Selaginella, with the hundreds of other species in new or resurrected genera.

Selaginella occurs mostly in the tropical regions of the world, with a handful of species to be found in the arctic-alpine zones of both hemispheres. Fossils assignable to the modern genus are known spanning over 300 million years from the Late Carboniferous to the present.

Description 
Selaginella species are creeping or ascendant plants with simple, scale-like leaves (microphylls) on branching stems from which roots also arise. The stems are aerial, horizontally creeping on the substratum (as in Selaginella kraussiana), sub-erect (Selaginella trachyphylla) or erect (as in Selaginella erythropus). The vascular steles are polystelic protosteles. Stem section shows the presence of more than two protosteles. Each stele is made up of diarch (having two strands of xylem) and exarch (growing outward in) xylems. The steles are connected with the cortex by means of many tube-like structures called trabeculae, which are modified endodermal cells with casparian strips on their lateral walls. The stems contain no pith.

In Selaginella, each microphyll and sporophyll has a small scale-like outgrowth called a ligule at the base of the upper surface. The plants are heterosporous with spores of two different size classes, known as megaspores and microspores.

Unusual for the lycopods, which nearly always have microphylls with a single unbranched vein, the microphylls of a few Selaginella species contain a branched vascular trace.

Under dry conditions, some species of Selaginella can survive dehydration. In this state, they may roll up into brown balls and be uprooted, but can rehydrate under moist conditions, become green again and resume growth. This phenomenon is known as poikilohydry, and poikilohydric plants such as Selaginella bryopteris are sometimes referred to as resurrection plants.

Taxonomy 

Some scientists still place the Selaginellales in the class Lycopodiopsida (often misconstructed as "Lycopsida"). Some modern authors recognize three generic divisions of Selaginella: Selaginella, Bryodesma Sojak 1992, and Lycopodioides Boehm 1760.  Lycopodioides would include the North American species S. apoda and S. eclipes, while Bryodesma would include S. rupestris (as Bryodesma rupestre). Stachygynandrum is also sometimes used to include the bulk of species.

The first major attempt to define and subdivide the group was by Palisot de Beauvois in 1803-1805.  He established the genus Selaginella as a monotypic genus, and placed the bulk of species in Stachygynandrum. Gymnogynum was another monotypic genus, but that name is superseded by his own earlier name of Didiclis.  This turns out, today, to be a group of around 45-50 species also known as the Articulatae, since his genus Didiclis/Gymnogynum was based on Selaginella plumosa.  He also described the genus Diplostachyum to include a group of species similar to Selaginella apoda. Spring inflated the genus Selaginella to hold all selaginelloid species four decades later.

Phylogenetic studies by Korall & Kenrick determined that the Euselaginella group, comprising solely the type species, Selaginella selaginoides and a closely related Hawaiian species, Selaginella deflexa, is a basal and anciently diverging sister to all other Selaginella species. Beyond this, their study split the remainder of species into two broad groups, one including the Bryodesma species, the Articulatae, section Ericetorum Jermy and others, and the other centered on the broad Stachygynandrum group.

Walton & Aston classification 
In the Manual of Pteridology, the following classification was used by Walton & Alston:

genus: Selaginella
subgenus: Euselaginella
group: selaginoides
group: pygmaea
group: uliginosa (Ericetorum)
group: rupestris (Tetragonostachys or Bryodesma)
subgenus: Stachygynandrum
series: Decumbentes
series: Ascendentes
series: Sarmentosae
series: Caulescentes
series: Circinatae
series: Articulatae
subgenus: Homostachys
subgenus: Heterostachys

However, this is now known to be highly paraphyletic in most of its groupings. Two recent classifications, employing modern methods of phylogenetic analysis, are as follows:

Weststrand & Korall, 2016 classification 

genus: Selaginella
 subgenus: Selaginella
 clade: "Rhizophoric clade"
 clade A
 subgenus Rupestrae [Bryodesma Sojak or Tetragonostachys Jermy, S. section Homeophyllae]
 subgenus Lepidophyllae [S. section Lepidophyllae]
 subgenus Gymnogynum [S. section Articulatae]
 subgenus Exaltatae [incl. S. section Megalosporum, S. section Myosurus]
 subgenus Ericetorum [S. section Lyallia]
 clade B
 subgenus Stachygynandrum [incl. S. (Boreoselaginella), S. (Pulviniella), S. (Heterostachys)]

Zhang & Zhou, 2015 classification 

genus: Selaginella
 subgenus: Selaginella Type: S. selaginoides (L.) P.Beauv. ex Mart. & Schrank
 subgenus: Boreoselaginella Type: S. sanguinolenta (L.) Spring
 subgenus: Ericetorum Type: S. uliginosa (Labill.) Spring
 section: Lyallia Type: S. uliginosa (Labill.) Spring
 section: Myosurus Type: S. myosurus Alston
 section: Megalosporarum Type: S. exaltata (Kunze) Spring
 section: Articulatae Type: S. kraussiana (Kunze) A.Braun
 section: Homoeophyllae Type: S. rupestris (L.) Spring (=Bryodesma Sojak or Tetragonostachys Jermy)
 section: Lepidophyllae Type: S. lepidophylla (Hook. & Grev.) Spring
 subgenus: Pulviniella Type: S. pulvinata (Hook. & Grev.) Maxim
 subgenus: Heterostachys Type: S. heterostachys Baker
 section: Oligomacrosporangiatae  Type: Selaginella uncinata (Desv. ex Poir.) Spring
 section: Auriculatae Type: S. douglasii (Hook. & Grev.) Spring
 section: Homostachys Type: : S. helvetica (L.) Link
 section: Tetragonostachyae Type: S. proniflora (L.) Baker
 section: Heterostachys  Type: S. brachystachya (Hook. & Grev.) Spring
 subgenus: Stachygynandrum Type: S. flabellata (L.) Spring
 section: Plagiophyllae Type: S. biformis A.Braun ex Kuhn
 section: Circinatae Type: S. involvens (Sw.) Spring
 section: Heterophyllae Type: S. flexuosa Spring
 section: Austroamericanae Type: S. hartwegiana Spring
 section: Pallescentes Type: S. pallescens (C.Presl) Spring
 section: Proceres Type: S. oaxacana Spring
 section: Ascendentes Type: S. alopecuroides Baker

Species 

There are about 750 known species of Selaginella. They show a wide range of characters; the genus is overdue for a revision which might include subdivision into several genera. Better-known spikemosses include:
Selaginella apoda – meadow spikemoss; eastern North America
Selaginella arizonica Maxon – west Texas to Arizona and Sonora, Mexico
Selaginella asprella
Selaginella bifida – Rodrigues Island
Selaginella biformis
Selaginella bigelovii
Selaginella braunii – Braun's spikemoss; China
Selaginella bryopteris – sanjeevani; India
Selaginella canaliculata – clubmoss; southeast Asia, Maluku Islands
Selaginella carinata
Selaginella cinerascens
Selaginella densa – lesser spikemoss; western North America
Selaginella denticulata
Selaginella eclipes – hidden spikemoss; eastern North America
Selaginella elmeri
Selaginella eremophila Maxon
Selaginella erythropus
Selaginella galotteii
Selaginella gigantea - From Venezuela.
Selaginella hansenii
Selaginella kraussiana – Krauss's spikemoss; Africa, Azores
Selaginella lepidophylla – resurrection plant, dinosaur plant, and flower of stone; Chihuahuan Desert, North America
Selaginella martensii – variegated spikemoss
Selaginella moellendorffii
Selaginella oregana
Selaginella plana – Asian spikemoss; tropical Asia
Selaginella poulteri
Selaginella pulcherrima
Selaginella rupestris – rock spikemoss, festoon pine, and northern Selaginella (eastern North America)
Selaginella rupincola Underw. – west Texas to Arizona and Sonora, Mexico
Selaginella selaginoides – lesser clubmoss; north temperate Europe, Asia and North America)
Selaginella sericea A.Braun – Ecuador
Selaginella serpens
Selaginella sibirica
Selaginella stellata – starry spikemoss; Mexico, Central America
Selaginella substipitata
Selaginella tamariscina
Selaginella tortipila
Selaginella uliginosa – Australia
Selaginella umbrosa
Selaginella uncinata – peacock moss, peacock spikemoss, blue spikemoss
Selaginella underwoodii Hieron. – west Texas to Wyoming and west into Arizona
Selaginella wallacei
Selaginella watsonii
Selaginella willdenowii – Willdenow's spikemoss, peacock fern; southeast Asia

A few species of Selaginella are desert plants known as "resurrection plants", because they curl up in a tight, brown or reddish ball during dry times, and uncurl and turn green in the presence of moisture.  Other species are tropical forest plants that appear at first glance to be ferns.

Cultivation 

A number of Selaginella species are popular plants for cultivation, mostly tropical species. Some of the species popularly cultivated and actively available commercially include:
S. kraussiana: golden clubmoss
S. martensii: frosty fern
S. moellendorffii: gemmiferous spikemoss
S. erythropus: red selaginella or ruby-red spikemoss
S. uncinata: peacock moss
S. lepidophylla: resurrection plant
S. braunii: arborvitae fern

References

External links 
 
 

 
Lycophyte genera